Police SC is a Sri Lankan professional football club based in Colombo. They play in the highest football league of Sri Lanka, the Sri Lanka Champions League. The team is under the patronage of the Sri Lanka Police.

Continental record

Football clubs in Sri Lanka
Police association football clubs